Horizon Field is a 2010 sculpture installation by Antony Gormley. It is the first art project of its kind erected in the Alps and the largest landscape intervention in Austria to date.

References

External links

Horizon Field on the Kunsthaus Bregenz Website
The Guardian
The Independent
BBC video
Useful information about the project in Vorarlberg with Google Earth application

2010 sculptures
Sculptures by Antony Gormley
Steel sculptures in Austria
Cast-iron sculptures
Outdoor sculptures in Austria